Senara or SENARA may refer to:

 Saint Senara, legendary Cornish saint, originally recorded as male, then as female
 Senara language, spoken in Burkina Faso and Mali
 The National Irrigation and Drainage Service (SENARA) - see Water resources management in Costa Rica

See also
 Sinara (disambiguation)
 Cynara (disambiguation)
 Synara San, a character in the animated television series Star Wars Resistance